Rank comparison chart of all armies and land forces of North and South American states.

Officers

Warrant officers (WO1–CW5) 
Warrant officers (WOs) and chief warrant officers (CWOs) in the US military rank below officers but above officer candidates and enlisted servicemen. The first warrant officer rank, WO1 does not have a "commission" associated with it, instead having a "warrant" from the secretary of the army. Warrant officers are allowed the same courtesies as a commissioned officer, but may have some restrictions on their duties that are reserved for commissioned officers. Warrant officers usually receive a commission once they are promoted to chief warrant officer 2 (CW2), but are usually not referred to as "commissioned officers". WO1s may be and sometimes are appointed by commission as stated in title 10USC.

See also
Comparative army officer ranks of Asia
Comparative army officer ranks of Europe
Ranks and insignia of NATO armies officers

References

Americas
Military comparisons